Born Again Virgin is an American comedy-drama series,  created by Ranada Shepard, that premiered on TV One on August 5, 2015. The pilot episode preview aired on February 6, 2015. The single-camera project set in Atlanta, and stars Danielle Nicolet as a 30-something writer who decides to become celibate after unsuccessful dates and relationships. Meagan Holder and Eva Marcille co-star as her best friends, while R&B singer Durrell "Tank" Babbs plays her neighbor and love interest.

On September 8, 2015, Born Again Virgin was renewed for a 12-episode second season, which premiered on Tuesday, December 8, 2015.
In 2016, Danielle Nicolet announced on social media that the show is not going forward for a third season.

Cast
Danielle Nicolet as Jenna
Meagan Holder as Kelly
Eva Marcille as Tara
Durrell "Tank" Babbs as Donovan
Robert Crayton as Scruffy Man

Reception
The premiere episode on August 5, 2015 garnered 264,000 viewers on live broadcast. TV One later announced that the series reached 1.4 million unique viewers P2+, Live +3. On the second week, the live audience grew to 310,000.

Episodes

Season 1 (2015)

Season 2 (2015—2016)

References

External links
 
 
 

2015 American television series debuts
2016 American television series endings
2010s American comedy-drama television series
2010s American romantic comedy television series
English-language television shows
Television shows set in Atlanta
Television shows filmed in Georgia (U.S. state)
TV One (American TV channel) original programming